Corynofrea rubra is a species of beetle in the family Cerambycidae. It was described by Karl Jordan in 1903. It is known from Cameroon, the Republic of the Congo, and Nigeria.

References

Crossotini
Beetles described in 1903